Iván Moro Fernández (born December 25, 1974, in Madrid) is a water polo player from Spain, who was a member of the national team that won the gold medal at the 1996 Summer Olympics in Atlanta, Georgia. He also competed for his native country in the Summer Games of 2000 and 2004.

He was the World Champion with Spain in 1998 in Perth, and in 2001 in Fukuoka.

He grew up in Alcorcón where he began playing water polo in the CN Ondarreta, with his elder brothers, Daniel Moro and Oscar Moro. He is the older brother of water polo player Daniel Moro. They competed together at the 2000 and 2004 Summer Olympics for the national team.

Daniel and Iván moved to Barcelona and played for several team. They also played for the Spanish National Water Polo team. 
Ivan won a European League in 1995 with Club Natacion Barcelona. He won five Spanish leagues, three Spanish King's cups and one Spanish Supercup.

The town hall of Alcorcón named a public swimming pool after Iván Moro. 
In 2006, Alcorcón's town hall appointed him as the General Manager of the local Foundation for the Sports in Alcorcón.

See also
 Spain men's Olympic water polo team records and statistics
 List of Olympic champions in men's water polo
 List of Olympic medalists in water polo (men)
 List of world champions in men's water polo
 List of World Aquatics Championships medalists in water polo

References
 Spanish Olympic Committee

External links
 

1974 births
Living people
Sportspeople from Madrid
Spanish male water polo players
Water polo centre backs
Water polo players at the 1996 Summer Olympics
Water polo players at the 2000 Summer Olympics
Water polo players at the 2004 Summer Olympics
Medalists at the 1996 Summer Olympics
Olympic gold medalists for Spain in water polo
World Aquatics Championships medalists in water polo
Water polo players from the Community of Madrid
20th-century Spanish people
21st-century Spanish people